Schloss Ueckermünde is a Schloss in Ueckermünde in Vorpommern-Greifswald, one of the latest buildings in the Pomeranian dukes in Germany. The building was surrounded by a water ditch and accessible over a drawbridge.

References 

 

Castles in Mecklenburg-Western Pomerania